Hoover is an unincorporated community in Platte County, in the U.S. state of Missouri. It is within the Kansas City metropolitan area.

History
A post office called Hoover was established in 1894, and remained in operation until 1899. The community has the name of James Hoover, a local merchant.

References

Unincorporated communities in Platte County, Missouri
Unincorporated communities in Missouri